Etah is one of the 80 Lok Sabha (parliamentary) constituencies in the Indian state of Uttar Pradesh.

Assembly segments
Presently, Etah Lok Sabha constituency comprises five Vidhan Sabha (legislative assembly) segments. These are:

Members of Parliament

Election results

2019

2014

See also
 Etah district
 List of Constituencies of the Lok Sabha

Notes

References

Lok Sabha constituencies in Uttar Pradesh
Etah district